The 2020 Monterrey Open (also known as the Abierto GNP Seguros for sponsorship reasons) was a women's tennis tournament played on outdoor hard courts. It was the 12th edition of the Monterrey Open and an International tournament on the 2020 WTA Tour. It took place at the Club Sonoma in Monterrey, Mexico, from 2 to 8 March 2020.

Points and prize money

Point distribution

Prize money 

*per team

Singles main draw entrants

Seeds 

1 Rankings as of 24 February 2020.

Other entrants 
The following players received wildcards into the main draw: 
  Kim Clijsters 
  Emma Navarro 
  Sloane Stephens 
  Venus Williams 

The following player received entry into the singles main draw using a protected ranking:
  Kateryna Bondarenko

The following player received entry as a special exempt:
  Leylah Annie Fernandez

The following players received entry from the qualifying draw:
  Lara Arruabarrena
  Giulia Gatto-Monticone 
  Olga Govortsova 
  Nadia Podoroska 
  Anna Karolína Schmiedlová 
  Stefanie Vögele

The following players received entry as lucky losers:
  Caroline Dolehide
  Varvara Flink
  Kristína Kučová
  Astra Sharma

Withdrawals 
Before the tournament
  Zarina Diyas → replaced by  Kristína Kučová
  Fiona Ferro → replaced by  Arantxa Rus
  Kirsten Flipkens → replaced by  Astra Sharma
  Magda Linette → replaced by  Caroline Dolehide
  Zheng Saisai → replaced by  Sara Sorribes Tormo
  Yulia Putintseva → replaced by  Varvara Flink

Retirements 
  Varvara Flink

Doubles main draw entrants

Seeds 

 Rankings as of February 24, 2020.

Other entrants 
The following pairs received wildcards into the doubles main draw:
  Elisabetta Cocciaretto /  Renata Zarazúa 
  Sara Errani /  Daniela Seguel

Withdrawals 
During the tournament
  Johanna Konta

Champions

Singles 

  Elina Svitolina def.  Marie Bouzková, 7–5, 4–6, 6–4

Doubles 

  Kateryna Bondarenko /  Sharon Fichman def.  Miyu Kato /  Wang Yafan, 4–6, 6–3, [10–7]

References

External links 
 Official website

2020 WTA Tour
2020
2020 in Mexican tennis
March 2020 sports events in Mexico